Ovomucoid is a protein found in egg whites. It is a trypsin inhibitor with three protein domains of the Kazal domain family. The homologs from chickens (Gallus gallus) and especially turkeys (Meleagris gallopavo) are best characterized. It is not related to the similarly named ovomucin, another egg white protein.

Chicken ovomucoid, also known as Gal d 1, is a known allergen. It is the protein most often causing egg allergy. At least four IgE epitopes have been identified. Three other egg white proteins are also identified as allergenic:  ovalbumin (Gal d 2), ovotransferrin (Gal d 3) and lysozyme (Gal d 4).

References 

Protease inhibitors
Avian proteins